The Embassy of India in Ljubljana is the diplomatic mission of India to Slovenia. The current ambassador is Namrata S. Kumar.

Events and Scholarships
The embassy encourages the locals to participate in cultural events, encourages the students to study in India by offering scholarships, trade investments for business entities and tourism.

As along the ICCR as well, students are encouraged more to participlate as well. Scholarships for "Ayush" program are also provided.

See also
 India–Slovenia relations
 Foreign relations of Slovenia
 Foreign relations of India
 List of diplomatic missions in Slovenia
 List of diplomatic missions of India

References

External links
 
 ICCR Scholarship programme
 AYUSH Scholarship programme

Slovenia
India
India–Slovenia relations